Banele Mthenjane is a South African rugby union player for the  in the Pro14 Rainbow Cup SA and  in the Currie Cup. His regular position is prop.

Mthenjane was named in the  squad for the Pro14 Rainbow Cup SA competition, and was then named in the  squad for the 2021 Currie Cup Premier Division.

References

South African rugby union players
Living people
Rugby union props
Lions (United Rugby Championship) players
Golden Lions players
2000 births
Rugby union players from Mpumalanga